Lawrence Oscar Lawson (September 11, 1842	- 29 Oct 1912) was a station keeper in the United States Life-Saving Service. He was given command of the Evanston, Illinois, Life–Saving Station Number 12, District 11 of the United States Life-Saving Service off the coast of Lake Michigan in 1880.

In 1899, Lawson led the crew of his surfboat on a heroic rescue of all 18 crewmen of the freighter Calumet. He was awarded the Gold Lifesaving Medal on October 17, 1890.

Biography
Lawson was born September 11, 1842  in Kalmar County, Sweden. He came to the United States in 1861 while serving a merchant seaman. He married Petrine Wold (1855–1941)  in Chicago during  1876. In 1878 they became residents of Evanston, Illinois. He retired in 1903.

Legacy

In 2010, Master Chief Petty Officer of the Coast Guard Charles "Skip" W. Bowen, the U.S. Coast Guard's senior enlisted person at the time, lobbied for the new s to be named after enlisted Coast Guardsmen, or personnel from its precursor services, who had distinguished themselves by their heroism.
The USCGC Lawrence O. Lawson was the 20th cutter to be launched.

References

External links

1842 births
1912 deaths
People from Kalmar
Recipients of the Gold Lifesaving Medal
United States Life-Saving Service personnel
Swedish emigrants to the United States